The Olympic Island Festival is an annual rock concert that takes place on Toronto's Olympic Island.  It was started in 2004 by Jay Ferguson of the band Sloan, when only Canadian musicians performed.  In subsequent years, the festival has featured bands from other countries.

Lineups

2004
August 7, 2004
 Death from Above 1979
 Arcade Fire
 Buck 65
 The Constantines
 Pilate (now known as Pilot Speed)
 The Stills
 Broken Social Scene
 Sam Roberts
 Sloan

2005
June 26, 2005
 Keren Ann
 Triumph of Lethargy
 The Most Serene Republic
 Do Make Say Think
 Metric
 Broken Social Scene
 Modest Mouse

2006
June 24, 2006
 J Mascis (of Dinosaur Jr)
 Raising the Fawn
 Feist
 Bloc Party
 Broken Social Scene

2008
June 7, 2008
 Young Galaxy
 Rogue Wave
 Death Cab for Cutie
 Stars

2009
The 2009 festival was cancelled in early May 2009. The event was cancelled because a strike by Toronto's municipal outside workers closed ferry service to the Toronto Islands. Broken Social Scene played a free show at Harbourfront on July 11, 2009, as an apology for the event's cancellation; this show was documented in Bruce McDonald's 2010 concert film This Movie Is Broken.

 Broken Social Scene
 Explosions in the Sky
 Apostle of Hustle
 Beach House
 Thunderheist
 Rattlesnake Choir

2010
June 19, 2010
 Broken Social Scene
 Pavement
 Band of Horses
 Beach House
 Timber Timbre
 Toronto Revue

August 14, 2010
 Arcade Fire
 Janelle Monáe
 The Sadies

Browsing their website. It seems they have had any concerts take place since August 14, 2010. There is no information anywhere else to sway this theory either.

References

Rock festivals in Canada
Music festivals in Toronto
Recurring events established in 2004